Mark Smith (born April 10, 1967) is a former American racing driver who competed in the CART IndyCar Series. Smith won the 1989 United States Formula Super Vee Championship and was the 1991  Indy Lights National Championship runner-up.

Career
Smith entered karting competition at the age of 14 and won 6 championships in multiple IKF divisions. In 1985 he moved up to Formula Ford scoring 4 race wins in two seasons and then advanced to Formula Super Vee.

After winning the 1989 United States Formula Super Vee Championship with 5 wins and 4 poles, Smith raced in Indy Lights from 1990 to 1992, finishing 3rd in series points his rookie year, and 2nd in 1991 capturing 3 wins and 5 poles along the way.

In December 1992, it was announced that Smith would make his racing debut in CART / Indy Car, signing with Arciero for the 1993 season. Arciero, being a sparsely budgeted team, fielded a year old, 1992 Penske PC-21/Chevrolet B, for 13 of the 16 scheduled races.

Smith scored two top 10 finishes in the first three races of the season. At the fourth round, the Indianapolis 500, Smith qualified twice for the race but was bumped from the field. His second bumping at the hands of Didier Theys happened just 6 minutes before the end of qualifications that year, an outcome that added to the Speedway myth about The Curse of the Smiths.

Smith continued to show good pace his rookie year with several top 10 qualifying performances.  At the Grand Prix of Portland, the 7th round of the season, Smith qualified the Arciero PC-21/Chevy B 6th on the grid between the Lolas' of Danny Sullivan and Mario Andretti. Early in the race while challenging for 5th Smith retired with a broken gearbox. The Penske transverse gearbox at the back of the PC-21 plagued Arciero during the 1993 season. After the Grand Prix of Portland in June, Smith retired from the next five races in a row with gearbox problems. Of the 13 races Arciero entered in 1993 the team finished four races, scoring points in three of those four races.

Mark qualified for the 1994 Indianapolis 500 and was bumped from the field by Bobby Rahal. With 14 minutes remaining in the final session, Smith made a bold attempt to qualify an ill-handling T93 Lola back-up car. His warm up lap of 221.8 mph was fast enough to make the race. On the following lap he crashed heavily into turn two.

Smith's best IndyCar finish was a 5th place at the 1994 Michigan 500.

Racing record

Career summary

Formula Super Vee 
(key) (Races in bold indicate pole position) (Races in italics indicate fastest lap)

Formula Pacific

New Zealand Grand Prix

CART Indy Lights

CART

Film and photography
Smith has produced a number of short films including Two Balloons, Denmark and A House, A Home. He is the co-author of two photography books The Powder Road and Österlandet. Smith is a graduate of the University of Oregon.

References

External links
Mark Smith's Driver DB Profile
Mark Smith's Indy Lights' statistics at ChampCarStats.com
Mark Smith's statistics at ChampCarStats.com

1967 births
Champ Car drivers
Indy Lights drivers
SCCA Formula Super Vee drivers
Formula Super Vee Champions
Toyota Racing Series drivers
Living people
Racing drivers from Portland, Oregon
University of Oregon alumni
Walker Racing drivers